The 1965 San Francisco Giants season was the Giants' 83rd year in Major League Baseball, their eighth year in San Francisco since their move from New York following the 1957 season, and their sixth at Candlestick Park. The team finished in second place in the National League with a 95–67 record, 2 games behind the Los Angeles Dodgers.

Offseason 
 Prior to 1965 season: Merritt Ranew was acquired by the Giants from the Milwaukee Braves.

Regular season

Season standings

Record vs. opponents

Opening Day lineup 
Jesús Alou
Tom Haller
Jim Ray Hart
Harvey Kuenn
Hal Lanier
Juan Marichal
Willie Mays
Willie McCovey
José Pagán

Notable transactions 
 May 13, 1965: Merritt Ranew was purchased from the Giants by the California Angels.
 May 29, 1965: Ed Bailey, Bob Hendley and Harvey Kuenn were traded by the Giants to the Chicago Cubs for Len Gabrielson and Dick Bertell.
 June 8, 1965: Rich Robertson was drafted by the Giants in the 5th round of the 1965 Major League Baseball Draft.
 July 19, 1965: Warren Spahn was signed as a free agent by the Giants.

Game log and schedule

Roster

Juan Marichal bat incident 
On August 22, 1965, Giants pitcher Juan Marichal was involved in a notorious incident that occurred in a game played against the Los Angeles Dodgers. Batting against Sandy Koufax, Marichal felt that Dodger catcher Johnny Roseboro's return throws had flown too close to his head. Words were exchanged, and Roseboro, throwing off his catcher's helmet and mask, rose to continue the argument. Marichal responded by hitting Roseboro's unprotected head with his bat. The benches cleared into a 14-minute brawl, while Giant captain Willie Mays escorted the bleeding Roseboro (who would require 14 stitches) back to the clubhouse. Marichal was ejected, suspended for nine days and fined US$1,750. Roseboro filed a lawsuit, but eventually settled out of court, supposedly for $7,000. Marichal and Roseboro would eventually go on to become close friends, reconciling any personal animosity and even autographing photographs of the brawl.

The image of Marichal raising his bat over his head to deliver a blow to Roseboro was carried in practically every newspaper in the nation and re-printed in Life magazine. Many people protested the apparently light punishment meted out, but as it was it hurt the Giants considerably. They were in a neck-and-neck pennant race with the Dodgers and the race was decided with only two games to play. Marichal's nine-day suspension cost him two pitching turns, and the Giants lost the pennant by two games.

Player stats

Batting

Starters by position 
Note: Pos = Position; G = Games played; AB = At bats; H = Hits; Avg. = Batting average; HR = Home runs; RBI = Runs batted in

Other batters 
Note: G = Games played; AB = At bats; H = Hits; Avg. = Batting average; HR = Home runs; RBI = Runs batted in

Pitching

Starting pitchers 
Note: G = Games pitched; IP = Innings pitched; W = Wins; L = Losses; ERA = Earned run average; SO = Strikeouts

Other pitchers 
Note: G = Games pitched; IP = Innings pitched; W = Wins; L = Losses; ERA = Earned run average; SO = Strikeouts

Relief pitchers 
Note: G = Games pitched; W = Wins; L = Losses; SV = Saves; ERA = Earned run average; SO = Strikeouts

Awards and honors 
 Willie Mays, National League Most Valuable Player

All-Stars 
All-Star Game

Farm system

Notes

References 
 1965 San Francisco Giants team page at Baseball Reference
 1965 San Francisco Giants team page at Baseball Almanac

San Francisco Giants seasons
San Francisco Giants season
San Fran